Acamptopappus is a genus of flowering plants in the family Asteraceae described as a genus in 1873.

Acamptopappus is native to the  deserts in southwestern North America. The name is derived from a- (not), campto- (bent), and pappus (down).  They are also commonly known as goldenheads.

Acamptopappus plants are eaten by the larvae of some Lepidoptera species including Coleophora acamtopappi which feeds on A. sphaerocephalus.

 Species
 A. shockleyi A.Gray -- Shockley's Goldenhead - California, Nevada
 A. sphaerocephalus (Harv. & A.Gray) A.Gray  -- Rayless Goldenhead - California, Nevada, Utah, Arizona

References

Bibliography

External links
 
 UVSC Herbarium - Acamptopappus
 Jepson Manual Treatment

Astereae
Asteraceae genera
Flora of the Southwestern United States
Flora of the California desert regions
North American desert flora
Taxa named by Asa Gray